Margareta of Opole (– 15 January 1454), was a Polish princess. She was a member of the Opole branch of House of Piast and by marriage a Duchess of Oława-Lubin-Chojnów.

She was the daughter of Duke Bolko IV of Opole, by his wife Margareta, possibly a member of the House of Görz.

Life
Around 1423, Margareta (aged eleven) married her kinsman, Duke Louis III of Oława. She bore him two sons: John I and Henry X. On 18 January 1441 Louis III died, leaving the Duchies of Lubin and Chojnów to his sons as co-rulers and the Duchy of Oława to his widow as her dower.

Henry X died in 1452 and was succeeded by his brother and co-ruler John I in Chojnów (Lubin was already pledged to the Dukes of Głogów in 1446); however, John I died one year later (1453), leaving from his marriage with Hedwig of Brzeg a son, Frederick I, now the only male representative of the Brzeg-Legnica branch.

Margareta survived her son John I by only two months. Oława was inherited by her grandson Frederick I, who eventually reunited all the family lands in 1488.

References

1412 births
1454 deaths
Piast dynasty